Third Five-Year plan may refer to:

 Third Five-Year Plan (Bhutan)
 Third Five-Year Plan (China)
 Third Five-Year Plan (India)
 Third Five-Year Plan (Nepal)
 Third Five-Year Plans (Pakistan)
 Third Five-Year Plan (Romania)
 Third Five-Year Plan (South Korea)
 Third Five-Year Plan (Soviet Union)
 Third Five-Pear Plan (Vietnam)

See also
Five-year plan
Second Five-Year Plan (disambiguation)
Fourth Five-Year Plan (disambiguation)